Hum Bhi Insaan Hain may refer to:

Hum Bhi Insaan Hain (1948 film)
Hum Bhi Insaan Hain (1959 film)
Hum Bhi Insaan Hain (1989 film)